An anacoluthon (from the Greek anakolouthon, from an-: "not" and ἀκόλουθος akólouthos: "following") is an unexpected discontinuity in the expression of ideas within a sentence, leading to a form of words in which there is logical incoherence of thought. Anacolutha are often sentences interrupted midway, where there is a change in the syntactical structure of the sentence and of intended meaning following the interruption.

An example is the Italian proverb "The good stuff – think about it." This proverb urges people to make the best choice. When anacoluthon occurs unintentionally, it is considered to be an error in sentence structure and results in incoherent nonsense. However, it can be used as a rhetorical technique to challenge the reader to think more deeply, or in "stream of consciousness" literature to represent the disjointed nature of associative thought.

Anacolutha are very common in informal speech, where a speaker might start to say one thing, then break off and abruptly and incoherently continue, expressing a completely different line of thought. When such speech is reported in writing, a dash (—) is often included at the point of discontinuity. The listener is expected to ignore the first part of the sentence, although in some cases it might contribute to the overall meaning in an impressionistic sense.

Examples

In Paradise Lost, John Milton uses an anacoluthon with Satan's first words to illustrate his initial confusion:

Additionally, Conrad Aiken's Rimbaud and Verlaine has an extended anacoluthon as it discusses anacoluthon:

Etymology
The word anacoluthon is a transliteration of the Greek  (anakólouthon), which derives from the privative prefix  (an-) and the root adjective  (akólouthos), "following". This, incidentally, is precisely the meaning of the Latin phrase non sequitur in logic. However, in Classical rhetoric anacoluthon was used both for the logical error of non sequitur and for the syntactic effect or error of changing an expected following or completion to a new or improper one.

Use of the term
The term "anacoluthon" is used primarily within an academic context. It is most likely to appear in a study of rhetoric or poetry. For example, the 3rd edition of The King's English, an English style guide written by H. W. Fowler and F. G. Fowler, mentions it as a major grammatical mistake.

We can hardly conclude even so desultory a survey of grammatical misdemeanours as this has been without mentioning the most notorious of all. The anacoluthon is a failure to follow on, an unconscious departure from the grammatical scheme with which a sentence was started, the getting switched off, imperceptibly to the writer, very noticeably to his readers, from one syntax track to another.—The King's English, 3rd edition, p. 371.

The term does occasionally appear in popular media as well. The word, though not the underlying meaning (see malapropism), has been popularized, due to its use as an expletive by Captain Haddock in the English translations of The Adventures of Tintin series of books.

The poet and critic Rachel Blau DuPlessis defines anacoluthon as "the grammatical switching of horses in midstream of a sentence: beginning a sentence in one grammar and ending it in another." She argues that it involves "the employing of multiple discursive ranges and disjunctive transpositions from one to the other[,] hence in any one poem, far from being in one mode, one register, one stable voice, a writer is like an acrobat ... a Barthesean weaver of a wacky fabric, or someone who 'samples', like a certain kind of contemporary DJ."

See also
English as She Is Spoke
Figure of speech
Non sequitur (literary device)
Rhetoric

References

Aiken, Conrad. Selected Poems. London: OUP, 2003. 141.
Brown, Huntington and Albert W. Halsall. "Anacoluthon" in Alex Preminger and T.V.F. Brogan, eds., The New Princeton Encyclopedia of Poetry and Poetics. Princeton, NJ: Princeton University Press, 1993. 67–8.

External links
Silva Rhetoricae reference

Figures of speech
Poetics
Rhetoric